is a Filipino-Japanese voice actress and singer from Tokyo, Japan.

Career
In 2017, she debuted as a singer in the Pretty Cure franchise and sang the opening of Kirakira Pretty Cure a la Mode.

Discography

Extended plays

Singles

Filmography

Dubbing
Marona's Fantastic Tale, Solange

References

1991 births
Japanese voice actresses
Japanese women singers
Living people
Singers from Tokyo
Japanese people of Filipino descent